Beitza or Bei'a (Aramaic: ביעה) (literally "egg", named after the first word) is a tractate in the Order of Moed, dealing with the laws of Yom Tov (holidays). It is Moed's seventh tractate in the Mishna, but the eighth in the Talmud Yerushalmi and typically fourth in the Talmud Bavli.

Structure
The tractate consists of five chapters with a total of 42 mishnayot. Its Babylonian Talmud version is of 40 pages and its Jerusalem Talmud version is of 22 pages.

An overview of the content of chapters is as follows: 

 Chapter 1 has ten mishnayot.  The main theme of this chapter is the law of muktzeh, which is  "a thing laid aside" and that cannot be used at the present time.   There is a difference of opinion between the schools of Shammai and Hillel as to the force of the law of muktzeh, specifically the application of the carrying prohibition to holy days. 
 Chapter 2 has ten mishnayot.
 Chapter 3 has eight mishnayot.
 Chapter 4 has seven mishnayot.
 Chapter 5 has seven mishnayot.

References